Demon in Disguise is an album by David Bromberg.  His second album, it was released by Columbia Records in 1972. It was released as a CD by Wounded Bird Records in 2005.

Demon in Disguise contains some songs that were recorded in the studio, and some that were recorded live. The musicians on the songs "Sharon" and "Demon in Disguise" include five members of the Grateful Dead — Jerry Garcia, Phil Lesh, Bill Kreutzmann, Keith Godchaux, and Donna Jean Godchaux.

"Sharon" was sampled by the Beastie Boys for the song "Johnny Ryall" on their album Paul's Boutique.

Track listing
Side one:
"Hardworkin' John" (David Bromberg) – 4:00 *
"Sharon" (Bromberg) – 6:07
Medley of Irish fiddle tunes (traditional, arranged by Bromberg) – 2:10 *
"Diamond Lil" (Bromberg) – 6:26
Side two:
"Jugband Song" (Bromberg) – 4:24 *
"Demon in Disguise" (Bromberg) – 5:08
"Tennessee Waltz" (Pee Wee King, Redd Stewart) – 3:06 *
"Mr. Bojangles" (Jerry Jeff Walker) – 7:30 *
"Sugar in the Gourd" (Tut Taylor) – 1:44 *

*recorded live

Personnel

Musicians
David Bromberg – guitar, vocals
Joshie Armstead – vocals
Steve Burgh – bass, vocals
Jerry Garcia – guitar
Donna Godchaux – vocals
Keith Godchaux – keyboards
Jeff Gutcheon – keyboards
Hilda Harris – vocals
Kenny Kosek – fiddle
Bill Kreutzmann – drums
Jack Lee – vocals
Phil Lesh – bass
Andrew McMahon – vocals
Tracy Nelson – vocals
Will Scarlett – harmonica
Tom Sheehan – bass
Andy Statman – mandolin, saxophone
Jody Stecher – mandolin, vocals
Tash Thomas – vocals

Production
Producer: David Bromberg
Engineering: James Green, David Brown, Stan Tonkel, Buddy Graham, Stan Hutto
Remix engineers: Tim Geelan, Don Meehan
Cover design: Sarina Bromberg, Hiroshi Marishima
Photographs: Jim McGuire

References

David Bromberg albums
1972 albums
Columbia Records albums
Grateful Dead